List of heads of state of Congo may refer to:

 List of heads of state of the Democratic Republic of the Congo
 List of heads of state of the Republic of the Congo